The 24th Awit Awards were held on December 12, 2011 at the Music Museum located in Greenhills, San Juan. They honored achievements in the Philippine music industry for the year 2010.

Jonathan Manalo was able to receive the most number of nominations with eight. Juris and Aiza Seguerra followed with five.

The ceremony was hosted by couple, Billy Crawford & Nikki Gil. Parokya ni Edgar along with  Chito Miranda, its lead vocalist, won the most awards with four, including Song of the Year. PARI also gave a plaque of recognition to Ronnie Ricketts, the Optical Media Board chairman, for his campaign against piracy.

Winners and nominees
Winners are listed first and highlighted in bold. Nominated producers, composers and lyricists are not included in this list, unless noted. For the full list, please go to their official website.

Performance Awards

Creativity Awards

{| class="wikitable" 
|-
! style="background:#EEDD82;" ! width:50%"  |Album of the Year
! style="background:#EEDD82;" ! width:50%"  |Song of the Year
|-

| valign="top" | 
 Juris, Now Playing – Juris Ngayon at Kailanman: A Tribute to George Canseco – Ogie Alcasid
 Jay R Sings OPM Love Classics – Jay R
 Fantasy – Regine Velasquez

| valign="top" |
 "Pakiusap Lang (Lasingin Nyo Ako)"Chito Miranda (composer & lyricist) "'Di Lang Ikaw" 
Juris & Aiza Seguerra (composers)
Juris (lyricist)
 "Falling in Love" 
Rey Cantong (composer & lyricist)
 "I'll Be the One" 
Christian Martinez (composer & lyricist)
 "Kaya Mo" 
Jonathan Manalo (composer & lyricist)

|-
! style="background:#EEDD82;" ! width:50%"  |Best Selling Album of the Year
! style="background:#EEDD82;" ! width:50%"  |Best Ballad Recording
|-

| valign="top" |
 Faithfully – Jovit Baldivino| valign="top" |
 "Pangarap Lang Kita" – Parokya ni Edgar "Muli" – Dingdong Avanzado
 "Isama Mo Ako" – Frencheska Farr
 "'Di Lang Ikaw" – Juris
 "Kung Tayo' Magkakalayo" – Gary Valenciano

|-
! style="background:#EEDD82;" ! width:50%"  |Best Rock/Alternative Recording
! style="background:#EEDD82;" ! width:50%" |Best World Music Recording
|-

| valign="top" |
 "Higante" – Ely Buendia & Francis M "Ang Huling Yakap ng Mundo" – Imago
 "Baliw" – Kiss Jane
 "Hanging Habagat" – Champ Lui Pio
 "Lakad" – Sandwich

| valign="top" |
 "Panatang Makabayani" – Jingle Buena "Hitik sa Bunga" – Brownman Revival

|-
! style="background:#EEDD82;" ! width:50%"  |Best Novelty Recording
! style="background:#EEDD82;" ! width:50%"  |Best Dance Recording
|-

| valign="top" |
 "Shawarma" – Shivaker "Ayaw sa Akin" – Bayani Agbayani
 "Jejemon" – Blanktape
 "Kung Sexy Lang Ako" – Fat Session
 "Mr. Papabol" – Vhong Navarro

| valign="top" |
 "Move" – Gabriel Valenciano feat. Kiana Valenciano "All Me" – Toni Gonzaga
 "Don't Tie Me Down" – Kyla
 "Shawarma" – Shivaker
 "Radio Revolution" – Quest

|-
! style="background:#EEDD82;" ! width:50%"  |Best Inspirational/Religious Recording
! style="background:#EEDD82;" ! width:50%"  |Best Christmas Recording
|-
| valign="top" |
 "Sa'yo Lamang" – Jamie Rivera & Hail Mary the Queen Children's Choir "Kaya Mo" – Protein Shake feat. Kean Cipriano & Ney Dimaculangan
 "May Pag-asa Pa" – Reuben Laurente
 "Lead Me Lord" – Aiza Seguerra
 "Mountain Wind" – True Faith

| valign="top" |
 "Ilang Tulog pa Ba?" – Ateneo Chamber Singers "Silent Night na Naman" – Bayani Agbayani
 "Nakaraang Pasko" – Christian Bautista 
 "Ngayong Pasko Magniningning ang Pilipino" – Toni Gonzaga & Gary Valenciano feat. University of Santo Tomas Singers
 "Christmas (A Time to Love)" – Erik Santos

|-
! style="background:#EEDD82;" ! width:50%"  |Best Rap Recording
! style="background:#EEDD82;" ! width:50%"  |Best R&B Recording
|-
| valign="top" |
 "Jejemon" – Blanktape "Shawarma" – Shivaker

| valign="top" |
 "Easy Ka Lang" – DJ Myke "You Make Me Feel" – Toni Gonzaga
 "Mahal Kita (Di Mo Pansin)" – Kyla
 "Back to Love" – Quest

|-
! style="background:#EEDD82;" ! width:50%"  |Best Song Written for Movie/TV/Stage Play
|-

| valign="top" |
 "Kaya Mo" (from RPG Metanoia'') – Protein Shake feat. Kean Cipriano & Ney Dimaculangan
 "Muli" (from Muli) – Dingdong Avanzado
 "Walang Hanggan" (from Imortal'') – Yeng Constantino & Ney Dimaculangan
|}

Technical Achievement Awards

Digital Awards
{| class="wikitable"
|-
! style="background:#EEDD82;" ! width:50%"  |ABS-CBN Interactive's Most Downloaded Song for 2010
! style="background:#EEDD82;" ! width:50%"  |ABS-CBN Interactive's Most Downloaded Artist for 2010
|-
| valign="top" | 
 "Muli" – Freddie Saturno & Vehnee Saturno
| valign="top" |
 Christian Bautista
|-
! style="background:#EEDD82;" ! width:50%"  |EGG's AllHits.ph Most Downloaded Song for 2010
! style="background:#EEDD82;" ! width:50%"  |EGG's AllHits.ph Most Downloaded Artist for 2010
|-
| valign="top" | 
 "Careless Whisper" – Kris Lawrence
| valign="top" | 
 Kris Lawrence
|-
! style="background:#EEDD82;" ! width:50%"  |I-Gateway Mobile Philippines Inc.'s Most Downloaded Song for 2010
! style="background:#EEDD82;" ! width:50%"  |I-Gateway Mobile Philippines Inc.'s Most Downloaded Artist for 2010
|-
| valign="top" | 
 "Ang Huling El Bimbo" – Ely Buendia
| valign="top" |
 Sabrina|}Note:The awards were given specifically to the composers, instead of the recording artists/groups.

Special Awards

Performers
This is in order of appearance'''.

References

External links
 

Awit Awards
2011 music awards
2011 in Philippine music